Aliabad-e Dovvom (also Romanized as ‘Alīābād-e Dovvom; also known as ‘Alīābād-e Soflá) is a village in Gowdin Rural District, in the Central District of Kangavar County, Kermanshah Province, Iran. At the 2006 census, its population was 119, in 27 families.

References 

Populated places in Kangavar County